No Time to Die is a 1958 British war film about an American sergeant in the British Army during the Second World War. In the US, the film was renamed Tank Force!.

Plot 
In Italian Libya during the North African campaign of the Second World War, a Royal Armoured Corps squadron of British tanks is destroyed in battle by German Afrika Korps panzers. A tank commanded by American Sgt. David Thatcher (Victor Mature) is hit and he and driver Trooper "Tiger" Noakes (Anthony Newley) bail out. The squadron's attached reconnaissance vehicle, commanded by Sgt. Kendall (Leo Genn), becomes stuck in the sand and the crew bail out too. The three survivors are quickly captured and transported to an Italian POW camp run by German Army Captain Ritter (Alfred Burke).

Unbeknownst to the Axis prison guards, Thatcher had previously tried to assassinate Joseph Goebbels in revenge for the killing of his Jewish wife and tries to escape at every turn before the Nazis discover his secret. The British commander Sgt. Kendall arranges an escape of Thatcher, Noakes, Bartlett (Sean Kelly), and a Polish prisoner (Bonar Colleano) in an ambulance before the Schutzstaffel can detain Thatcher, and the Pole kills the German mole Johnson (Kenneth Fortescue). They escape through the Libyan Desert in sandstorms, briefly taking shelter at the nightclub of Thatcher's friend Carola (Luciana Paluzzi) in Italian Benghazi before she is accidentally shot by the Italian officer Alberto (Robert Rietti).

Over the course of the trip the Pole grows increasingly homicidal, indiscriminately killing two German officers the group captures. After Kendall vows to court-martial the Pole when they return home, he allows a Bedouin tribe led by a sheikh (Maxwell Shaw) loyal to the SS to kill Bartlett and capture the surviving men. When the SS tries to torture Thatcher into confessing, Captain Ritter becomes so disgusted that he helps the men escape and then commits suicide. Kendall takes the sheikh and the SS colonel (Martin Boddey) hostage, but he Pole initiates a shootout that leaves him wounded and the sheikh and the colonel dead. They steal a truck, which is met by a rival group of Bedouins which warn them of a nearby German panzer division. They capture a tank, but Kendall and the Pole are killed while their tank is disabled. However, a British tank battalion arrives to save them. The German panzers are defeated, and Thatcher and Noakes bury Kendall.

Cast 
 Victor Mature as Sgt. David Thatcher
 Leo Genn as Sgt. Kendall
 Anthony Newley as Noakes
 Bonar Colleano as the Pole
 Luciana Paluzzi as Carola
 Sean Kelly as Bartlett
 Kenneth Fortescue as Johnson
 Anne Aubrey as Italian girl
 George Coulouris as Camp commandant
 Alfred Burke as Captain Ritter
 David Lodge as Maj. Fred Patterson
 Maxwell Shaw as the Sheikh
 Alan Tilvern as Silverio
 George Pravda as German Sgt.
 Percy Herbert as 1st British soldier
 Kenneth Cope as 2nd British soldier
 Robert Rietti as Alberto
 Martin Boddey as Gestapo Colonel
 Richard Marner as German colonel
 Peter Elliott as Italian officer
 Julian Sherrier as 2nd Italian officer
 Robert Bruce as Italian driver
 Bob Simmons as Mustapha
 Andreas Malandrinos as Italian cook
 Ernst Walder as German Corporal

Production 
The film was initially based on a 1954 novel of the same name by Ronald Kemp, but later received a different script unrelated to the novel with the exception of the title and the setting. Warwick Productions bought the film rights in 1955 and tried to get Montgomery Clift to star. Sy Bartlett was assigned to write the script.

In March 1957 Merle Miller was hired to rewrite the script. Then Richard Maibaum did a draft. The script eventually became about five Allied soldiers, two Englishmen, a Pole, an American and an Australian, who escape an Italian POW camp in the Second World War.

Alan Ladd was mentioned as a possibility as star. In April 1957 Terence Young arrived in Hollywood to find two American leading men for the film. Van Johnson, who had just made a film with Young, was a leading contender. Jeff Chandler turned down the role (and fee of $200,000).

In August 1957 Victor Mature signed a two-picture contract with Warwick, No Time to Die and The Man Inside.

In September, Mature left England for six weeks of location filming in the Libyan Desert, near Tripoli. The Queens Bays Tank Regiment assisted in production of the film.

No Time to Die featured authentic war time Cromwell tanks as well as post-war Centurions and Charioteers as both British and German tanks. In the opening battle Leo Genn commands an AEC Armoured Car and wears the beret of the Cherry Pickers.

Sean Kelly was a South African actor who had been signed by Warwick to a seven-year contract.

It was the last in a seven-picture commitment between Warwick and Columbia.

Reception
Kinematograph Weekly listed it as being "in the money" at the British box office in 1958. When the film was initially released in the United States, it was 20 minutes shorter than the version released in the United Kingdom.

Legacy
The 25th James Bond film, 2021's No Time to Die, shares a title with this film, which was directed by Terence Young, produced by Albert R. "Cubby" Broccoli, and written by Richard Maibaum, the original director, producer and writer of the James Bond films.

References

External links 
 No Time to Die at the British Film Institute
 
 
 
 

1958 films
North African campaign films
British war films
Columbia Pictures films
CinemaScope films
Films with screenplays by Richard Maibaum
Films shot in Libya
Films about the British Army
1950s English-language films
1950s British films